Tenellia iris is a species of sea slug, an aeolid nudibranch, a marine gastropod mollusc in the family Fionidae.

Distribution
This species was described from the reef flat outside Bellairs Research Institute, Barbados.

Description 
The typical adult size of this species is 5–10 mm.

References 

Tergipedidae
Gastropods described in 1983